Finland has two official languages, Finnish and Swedish. Many places in the country have different names in Finnish and Swedish, both being official endonyms.

Regions

Municipalities
Some Finnish municipalities with endonyms in both Finnish and Swedish, the majority language of the municipality stands first:

Finnish Akaa / Swedish 
Finnish Alavus / Swedish 
Finnish Enontekiö / Swedish Enontekis
Finnish Espoo / Swedish Esbo
Finnish Eurajoki / Swedish Euraåminne
Finnish Hailuoto / Swedish Karlö
Finnish Halsua / Swedish Halso
Finnish Hämeenkyrö / Swedish Tavastkyro
Finnish Hämeenlinna / Swedish Tavastehus
Finnish Hamina / Swedish Fredrikshamn
Finnish Hanko / Swedish Hangö
Finnish Hartola / Swedish Gustav Adolfs
Finnish Helsinki / Swedish Helsingfors
Finnish Huittinen / Swedish Vittis
Finnish Hyvinkää / Swedish Hyvinge
Finnish Ii / Swedish Ijo
Finnish Iisalmi / Swedish Idensalmi
Finnish Iitti / Swedish Itis
Finnish Ikaalinen / Swedish Ikalis
Finnish Ilmajoki / Swedish Ilmola
Finnish Ilomantsi / Swedish Ilomants
Finnish Inari / Swedish Enare
Swedish Ingå / Finnish Inkoo
Finnish Isojoki / Swedish Storå
Finnish Isokyrö / Swedish Storkyro
Swedish Jakobstad / Finnish Pietarsaari
Finnish Järvenpää / Swedish Träskända
Finnish Jokioinen / Swedish Jockis
Finnish Joroinen / Swedish Jorois
Finnish Juuka / Swedish Juga
Finnish Juva / Swedish Jockas
Finnish Kaarina / Swedish S:t Karins
Finnish Kajaani / Swedish Kajana
Finnish Karijoki / Swedish Botöm
Finnish Karkkila / Swedish Högfors
Finnish Kaskinen / Swedish Kaskö
Finnish Kauniainen / Swedish Grankulla
Finnish Kaustinen / Swedish Kaustby
Finnish Kerava / Swedish Kervo
Finnish Keuruu / Swedish Keuru
Swedish Kimitoön / Finnish Kemiönsaari
Finnish Kirkkonummi / Swedish Kyrkslätt
Finnish Kitee / Swedish Kides
Finnish Kokemäki / Swedish Kumo
Finnish Kokkola / Swedish Karleby
Finnish Kontiolahti / Swedish Kontiolax
Swedish Korsholm / Finnish Mustasaari
Finnish Köyliö / Swedish Kjulo
Swedish Kristinestad / Finnish Kristiinankaupunki
Swedish Kronoby / Finnish Kruunupyy
Finnish Kuhmoinen / Swedish Kuhmois
Finnish Kustavi / Swedish Gustavs
Finnish Lahti / Swedish Lahtis
Finnish Laihia / Swedish Laihela
Finnish Laitila / Swedish Letala
Finnish Lapinjärvi / Swedish Lappträsk
Finnish Lappeenranta / Swedish Villmanstrand
Finnish Lapua / Swedish Lappo
Swedish Larsmo / Finnish Luoto
Finnish Laukaa / Swedish Laukas
Finnish Lempäälä / Swedish Lembois
Finnish Lieto / Swedish Lundo
Finnish Liminka / Swedish Limingo
Finnish Liperi / Swedish Libelits
Finnish Lohja / Swedish Lojo
Finnish Loppi / Swedish Loppis
Finnish Loviisa / Swedish Lovisa
Finnish Luhanka / Swedish Luhanga
Finnish Maaninka / Swedish Maninga
Swedish Malax / Finnish Maalahti
Finnish Mänttä-Vilppula / Swedish Mänttä-Filpula
Swedish Mariehamn / Finnish Maarianhamina
Finnish Marttila / Swedish S:t Mårtens
Finnish Merikarvia / Swedish Sastmola
Finnish Mikkeli / Swedish S:t Michel
Finnish Mynämäki / Swedish Virmo
Finnish Myrskylä / Swedish Mörskom
Finnish Naantali / Swedish Nådendal
Swedish Närpes / Finnish Närpiö
Finnish Nousiainen / Swedish Nousis
Swedish Nykarleby / Finnish Uusikaarlepyy
Finnish Oulainen / Swedish Oulais
Finnish Oulu / Swedish Uleåborg
Finnish Paimio / Swedish Pemar
Finnish Paltamo / Swedish Paldamo
Swedish Pargas / Finnish Parainen
Finnish Pirkkala / Swedish Birkala
Finnish Pomarkku / Swedish Påmark
Finnish Pori / Swedish Björneborg
Finnish Pornainen / Swedish Borgnäs
Finnish Porvoo / Swedish Borgå
Finnish Pöytyä / Swedish Pöytis
Finnish Pukkila / Swedish Buckila
Finnish Pyhtää / Swedish Pyttis
Finnish Raahe / Swedish Brahestad
Finnish Raisio / Swedish Reso
Swedish Raseborg / Finnish Raasepori
Finnish Rauma / Swedish Raumo
Finnish Ruokolahti / Swedish Ruokolax
Finnish Sauvo / Swedish Sagu
Finnish Savonlinna / Swedish Nyslott
Finnish Siikainen / Swedish Siikais
Finnish Sipoo / Swedish Sibbo
Finnish Siuntio / Swedish Sjundeå
Finnish Taivassalo / Swedish Tövsala
Finnish Tampere / Swedish Tammerfors
Finnish Teuva / Swedish Östermark
Finnish Tornio / Swedish Torneå
Finnish Turku / Swedish Åbo
Finnish Tuusula / Swedish Tusby
Finnish Ulvila / Swedish Ulvsby
Finnish Uurainen / Swedish Uurais
Finnish Uusikaupunki / Swedish Nystad
Finnish Vaasa / Swedish Vasa
Finnish Vantaa / Swedish Vanda
Finnish Vehmaa / Swedish Vemo
Finnish Vesilahti / Swedish Vesilax
Finnish Veteli / Swedish Vetil
Finnish Vihti / Swedish Vichtis
Finnish Vimpeli / Swedish Vindala
Finnish Virolahti / Swedish Vederlax
Finnish Virrat / Swedish Virdois
Swedish Vörå / Finnish Vöyri
Finnish Ylitornio / Swedish Övertorneå
Finnish Ähtäri / Swedish

Districts in cities and towns

Helsinki

Finnish Ala-Malmi / Swedish Nedre Malm
Finnish Alppiharju / Swedish Åshöjden
Finnish Aurinkolahti / Swedish Solvik
Finnish Eira / Swedish Eira
Finnish Etelä-Haaga / Swedish Södra Haga
Finnish Haaga / Swedish Haga
Finnish Hakaniemi / Swedish Hagnäs
Finnish Hakuninmaa / Swedish Håkansåker
Finnish Haltiala / Swedish Tomtbacka
Finnish Heikinlaakso / Swedish Henriksdal
Finnish Hermanni / Swedish Hermanstad
Finnish Herttoniemen teollisuusalue / Swedish Hertonäs industriområde
Finnish Herttoniemenranta / Swedish Hertonäs strand
Finnish Herttoniemi / Swedish Hertonäs
Finnish Hevossalmi / Swedish Hästnässund
Finnish Hietalahti / Swedish Sandviken
Finnish Itä-Pakila / Swedish Östra Baggböle
Finnish Itä-Pasila / Swedish Östra Böle
Finnish Itäsaaret / Swedish Östra holmarna
Finnish Jollas, Helsinki / Swedish Jollas, Helsingfors
Finnish Kaarela / Swedish Kårböle
Finnish Kaartinkaupunki / Swedish Gardesstaden
Finnish Kaisaniemi / Swedish Kajsaniemi
Finnish Kaivopuisto / Swedish Brunnsparken
Finnish Kallahti / Swedish Kallvik
Finnish Kallio / Swedish Berghäll
Finnish Kampinmalmi / Swedish Kampmalmen
Finnish Keski-Pasila / Swedish Mellersta Böle
Finnish Keski-Vuosaari / Swedish Mellersta Nordsjö
Finnish Kivihaka / Swedish Stenhagen
Finnish Kluuvi / Swedish Gloet
Finnish Koivusaari / Swedish Björkholmen
Finnish Konala / Swedish Kånala
Finnish Koskela / Swedish Forsby
Finnish Kruununhaka / Swedish Kronohagen
Finnish Kulosaari / Swedish Brändö
Finnish Kumpula / Swedish Gumtäkt
Finnish Kurkimäki / Swedish Tranbacka
Finnish Kuusisaari / Swedish Granö
Finnish Laajasalo / Swedish Degerö
Finnish Laakso / Swedish Dal
Finnish Länsi-Herttoniemi / Swedish Västra Hertonäs
Finnish Länsi-Pakila / Swedish Västra Baggböle
Finnish Länsi-Pasila / Swedish Västra Böle
Finnish Lassila / Swedish Lassas
Finnish Lauttasaari / Swedish Drumsö
Finnish Lehtisaari / Swedish Lövö
Finnish Malmi / Swedish Malm
Finnish Marttila / Swedish Martas
Finnish Marjaniemi / Swedish Marudd
Finnish Maunula / Swedish Månsas
Finnish Maunulanpuisto / Swedish Månsasparken
Finnish Maununneva / Swedish Magnuskärr
Finnish Meilahti / Swedish Mejlans
Finnish Mellunkylä / Swedish Mellungsby
Finnish Meri-Rastila / Swedish Havsrastböle
Finnish Merihaka / Swedish Havshagen
Finnish Metsälä / Swedish Krämertsskog
Finnish Munkkiniemi / Swedish Munksnäs
Finnish Munkkisaari / Swedish Munkholmen
Finnish Munkkivuori / Swedish Munkshöjden
Finnish Mustavuori / Swedish Svarta backen
Finnish Mustikkamaa–Korkeasaari / Swedish Blåbärslandet-Högholmen
Finnish Myllypuro / Swedish Kvarnbäcken
Finnish Niemenmäki / Swedish Näshöjden
Finnish Niinisaari / Swedish Bastö
Finnish Oulunkylä / Swedish Åggelby
Finnish Pajamäki / Swedish Smedjebacka
Finnish Pakila / Swedish Baggböle
Finnish Pasila / Swedish Böle
Finnish Patola / Swedish Dammen
Finnish Pihlajamäki / Swedish Rönnbacka
Finnish Pihlajisto / Swedish Rönninge
Finnish Pikku Huopalahti / Swedish Lillhoplax
Finnish Pirkkola / Swedish Britas
Finnish Pitäjänmäen teollisuusalue / Swedish Sockenbacka industriområde
Finnish Pitäjänmäki / Swedish Sockenbacka
Finnish Pohjois-Haaga / Swedish Norra Haga
Finnish Pohjois-Pasila / Swedish Norra Böle
Finnish Puistola / Swedish Parkstad
Finnish Pukinmäki / Swedish Bocksbacka
Finnish Punavuori / Swedish Rödbergen
Finnish Puotila / Swedish Botby gård
Finnish Puotinharju / Swedish Botbyhöjden
Finnish Puroniitty / Swedish Bäckängen
Finnish Rastila / Swedish Rastböle
Finnish Reijola / Swedish Grejus
Finnish Reimarla / Swedish Reimars
Finnish Roihupellon teollisuusalue / Swedish Kasåkers industriområde
Finnish Ruskeasuo / Swedish Brunakärr
Finnish Salmenkallio / Swedish Sundberg
Finnish Santahamina / Swedish Sandhamn
Finnish Seurasaari / Swedish Fölisön
Finnish Siltamäki / Swedish Brobacka
Finnish Siltasaari / Swedish Broholmen
Finnish Sörnäinen / Swedish Sörnäs
Finnish Suomenlinna / Swedish Sveaborg
Finnish Suurmetsä / Swedish Storskog
Finnish Suutarila / Swedish Skomakarböle
Finnish Tahvonlahti / Swedish Stansvik
Finnish Talinranta / Swedish Talistranden
Finnish Talosaari / Swedish Husö
Finnish Töölö / Swedish Tölö
Finnish Torpparinmäki / Swedish Torparbacken
Finnish Toukola / Swedish Majstad
Finnish Vallila / Swedish Vallgård
Finnish Vanhakaupunki / Swedish Gammelstaden / English alternative: Old town
Finnish Ullanlinna / Swedish Ulrikasborg
Finnish Vironniemi / Swedish Estnäs
Finnish Ylä-Malmi / Swedish Övre Malm

See also
Languages of Finland
Toponyms of Finland
List of municipalities of Finland in which Finnish is not the sole official language

References

Languages of Finland
Populated places in Finland
Finnish